Oleksandr Kochura (born 7 March 1986 in Kirovohrad, Ukrainian SSR) is a retired professional Ukrainian football midfielder and current football manager.

Career
Kochura is a product of FC Zirka and FC Olimpik sportive schools in his native city Kropyvnytskyi. He spent time with different Ukrainian teams that play mainly in the Ukrainian First League, and in March 2013 he returned to FC Zirka.

References

External links
 
 

Ukrainian footballers
Sportspeople from Kropyvnytskyi
Association football midfielders
FC Naftovyk Dolyna players
FC Olimpik Kropyvnytskyi players
FC Obolon-Brovar Kyiv players
FC Zirka Kropyvnytskyi players
FC Oleksandriya players
Ukrainian Premier League players
1986 births
Living people
Ukrainian football managers